Parasitaxus usta is a rare species of conifer of the family Podocarpaceae, and the sole species of the genus Parasitaxus. It is a woody shrub up to 1.8 m found only in the remote, densely forested areas of New Caledonia, first discovered and described by Vieillard in 1861.

It is generally mentioned that Parasitaxus usta is the only known parasitic gymnosperm. The species remarkably lacks roots and is always found attached to the roots of Falcatifolium taxoides (another member of the Podocarpaceae). However, the question is still left open, as the plant is in any case not a haustorial parasite, which is usually the case with angiosperms. Certain experts therefore consider the plant as a  myco-heterotroph.

Molecular phylogenetic analysis also suggest affinities between Parasitaxus and the genera Manoao (New Zealand) and Lagarostrobos (Tasmania). Parasitaxus has been shown to contain high levels of chlorophyll.  However, a genome analysis shows that many genes for photosynthesis are missing from the parasite's plastid genome, strongly suggesting that Parasitaxus completely depends on its host for survival. 
 
The species was first described as Dacrydium ustum Vieill.; other synonyms include Podocarpus ustus (Vieill.) Brongn. & Gris, and Nageia usta (Vieill.) Kuntze. The name is often cited as Parasitaxus ustus, but this is grammatically incorrect, as, according to Latin, the genus name Parasitaxus is (like Taxus) gender-feminine, with which the species name's gender must agree (Nickrent 2006).  The scientific name translates as "Burnt Parasitic Yew."

Etymology
Usta means 'parched'.

References

Gymnosperm Database: Parasitaxus usta
Nickrent, D. (2006). Parasitic Plants website: Is Parasitaxus  Parasitic?.

Endemic flora of New Caledonia
Near threatened plants
Monotypic conifer genera
Podocarpaceae genera
Podocarpaceae